Clap Clap Riot is a five-piece indie rock band based in Auckland, New Zealand.

History
The band originated in Canterbury and was originally named Band Theft Auto.

Discography

Albums

EPs

Singles

Members
Stephen Heard – Vocals and Guitar
Dave Rowlands – Guitar
Tristan Colenso – Bass guitar
Alex Freer – Drums
Anthony Metcalf – Keyboards and Guitar

Past members
Sam Mountain – Drums – 2006 to 2010
Strachan Rivers – Drums – 2010 to 2012
Jonathan Pearce – Guitar / Keyboards
Mark Perkins – Guitar / Keys

References

External links
Instagram Page
Spotify Profile

New Zealand indie rock groups